Volley, formerly known as Dunlop Volley is an Australian brand of athletic shoes manufactured by Brand Collective. Formerly, it was produced by Dunlop Sport (Australia), a sports equipment subsidiary of Pacific Brands, which separated the Volley brand into its Brand Collective Pty Ltd which was sold to private equity firm Anchorage Capital Partners in November 2014.

The shoe is constructed of cotton canvas with a thermoplastic rubber sole. It was introduced by Dunlop Australia in 1939, and has had only minor changes to its design since then. Originally plain white in colour with a vulcanised rubber sole, it evolved into the iconic green and gold stripe along the ankle and heel with a direct injection sole in the 1970s. Today, the standard design is white with a 3-stripe woven tape on the heel, while the green and gold stripe, and an all-black version, are also available.

History 
The Volley was originally developed in 1939 as a tennis shoe by Adrian Quist, a famous Australian tennis player and employee of Dunlop. Adrian borrowed a pair of boat shoes (with Herringbone sole) during his Davis Cup tournament win in the US and upon his return, convinced Dunlop to develop this high grip sports shoe. The original shoe was called the Volley OC (Orthopaedically Correct) and was worn by Rod Laver, Margaret Court, Evonne Goolagong Cawley, Ken Rosewall, etc. That same year, the Volley OC was released. In the 1970s, Dunlop released a new style of Volley named the Volley International. The new model featured a new design upper and direct injection thermoplastic sole. From 1978 to 1985, there was a large volume of sales of the Volley in Australia. It became virtually the standard tennis shoe, and was also popular with roofers, who needed a sure foothold on sloping roof surfaces. In 1976 Mark Edmondson won the Australian Open catapulting the Volley back into the spotlight.

During the early 1980s, Dunlop briefly released a 'basketball boot' version of the Volley International which covered the ankle. These shoes, which had the high-grip herringbone tread, were highly prized by rafters and bushwalkers, who appreciated the dissipation of the friction point at the heel, the reduced entry of sand and debris, and the protection to the ankles against knocks from rocks when wading in rapids. The cotton canvas around the ankle was a seamless extension of the Volley's uppers; it did not seek to 'support' the ankle, only protect it. However, the boot was unavailable by 1983. Dunlop Volleys were standard issue by the Australian Army and Royal Australian Air Force until the late 1980s, and are still issued by the Royal Australian Navy, although sometimes the Spalding imitation shoe is substituted.

In 1998, Dunlop Footwear moved production offshore and in 2004, Dunlop Sport became part of the Pacific Brands group. By 2009, the Dunlop volley brand was diluted with a vast array of casual slip on shoes and plagued with production quality issues and constant supplier changes of the Dunlop Volley.

In 2011, Dunlop created Volley as a stand-alone brand and revised the "Volley International" back to its 1970s design and brought the original OC and SS shoes back into the line-up. Volley also released the High Leap variation on the International by 2012.

From 2014 to 2017, Volley released some new styles which included the Grass-Court. This edition was launched through a collaboration with Tony Bianco and helped Volley elevate the brand with the first ever Volleys at over $100 Retail AUD. These styles tied back to some of the older Dunlop brand's iconic heritage tennis silhouettes. 

The Dunlop Volley was included as part of the Australian Olympics team's official uniform for the 2012 Summer Olympics.

References

External links
 

Athletic shoe brands
Shoe brands
Shoe companies of Australia
Australian companies established in 1939
Clothing companies established in 1939